Zōshigaya (also ) is a neighborhood in Toshima, Tokyo. Zōshigaya includes Zōshigaya 1-chome though Zōshigaya 3-chome as well as parts of Minami-Ikebukuro.

Major locations
 Zōshigaya Cemetery, in Minami-Ikebukuro
 Two sequential Tokyo Sakura Tram train stations:
 Kishibojimmae Station
 Toden-zoshigaya Station, in Minami-Ikebukuro
A Tokyo Metro Fukutoshin Line train station:
 Zōshigaya Station (Tokyo Metro), constructed directly underneath Kishibojin-mae Station, with the announced beginning of operations date of June 14, 2008.

See also
 Kishibojin is Japanese for Hariti, a Buddhist goddess

Neighborhoods of Tokyo
Districts of Toshima